Octotropideae is a tribe of flowering plants in the family Rubiaceae and contains about 103 species in 18 genera. Its representatives are found in the paleotropics.

Genera 
Currently accepted names

 Canephora Juss. (5 sp) - Madagascar
 Didymosalpinx Keay (5 sp) - Tropical Africa
 Feretia Delile (4 sp) - Tropical and Southern Africa
 Fernelia Comm. ex Lam. (4 sp) - Mascarene Islands
Flagenium Baill. (6 sp) - Madagascar
 Galiniera Delile (2 sp) - Tropical Africa, Madagascar
 Hypobathrum Blume (31 sp) - Tropical Asia
 Jovetia Guédès (1 sp) - Madagascar
 Kraussia Harv. (4 sp) - Kenya, Tanzania, Mozambique, South Africa, Socotra
 Lamprothamnus Hiern (1 sp) - Somalia, Kenya, Tanzania
 Lemyrea (A.Chev.) A.Chev. & Beille (4 sp) - Madagascar
 Nargedia Bedd. (1 sp) - Sri Lanka
 Octotropis Bedd. (1 sp) - India
 Paragenipa Baill. (1 sp) - Seychelles
 Polysphaeria Hook.f. (22 sp) - Tropical Africa, Madagascar
 Pouchetia A.Rich. ex DC. (4 sp) - Western Tropical Africa to Sudan and Northern Angola
 Ramosmania Tirveng. & Verdc. (2 sp) - Rodrigues
 Villaria Rolfe (5 sp) - Philippines

Synonyms

 Exosolenia Baill. ex Drake = Lemyrea
 Higginsia Blume = Hypobathrum
 Petunga DC. = Hypobathrum
 Phylanthera Noronha = Hypobathrum
 Platymerium Bartl. ex DC. = Hypobathrum
 Ptychostigma Hochst. = Galiniera
 Rhabdostigma Hook.f. = Kraussia
 Spicillaria A.Rich. = Hypobathrum

References 

 
Ixoroideae tribes